The Opel Olympia Rekord was a two-door family car which replaced the Opel Olympia in March 1953. Innovations included the strikingly modern Ponton format body-work incorporating numerous styling features from the United States and large amounts of chrome decoration both on the outside and on the inside.

The car was offered till 1957. Unusually, at least in European terms, the manufacturer followed the example of General Motors in Detroit by applying an annual facelift. There was a new front grill every year along with other detailed modifications to the trim. The policy of annual facelifts ensured plenty of publicity, and the car was a commercial success, achieving second place in the West German sales charts year after year, beaten to the top slot only by the much smaller, less costly and at this time seemingly unstoppable Volkswagen. Around 580,000 Olympia Rekords were produced. Opel boss Edward Zdunek justified the annual facelifts with the explanation that they gave customers the possibility of "sozialen Differenzierung" (social differentiation). Nevertheless, commentators also noted that the Detroit inspired annual face-lift disadvantaged owners because it depressed second hand values for the Olympia Rekord. The Olympia Rekord set a pattern that Opel would follow for many decades, providing a lot more car for the money than most competitor manufacturers.

By contrast to the modern and annually modified bodywork, the 1488 cc ohc four-cylinder water-cooled engine was very little changed since it had first been offered in the Opel Olympia back in 1937. When the Olympia Rekord first appeared in 1953 maximum power output of 40 hp (29 kW) at 3800 rpm was claimed. This was increased at the end of 1955 for the 1956 model year to 45 hp (33 kW) at 3900 rpm. At the same time there was a marginal increase in maximum torque, and the compression ratio was raised from 6.5:1 to 6.9:1. The 1950s was a decade during which minimum fuel octanes were raised progressively across western Europe: the manufacturer continued to specify "normal" grade fuel for the Olympia Rekord throughout its life.

The Name
The car retained the "Olympia" name, originally applied in 1935 to the predecessor model in anticipation of the 1936 Olympic Games. The Olympia had been a defining model for Opel, featuring then revolutionary monococque body construction, and intended to be produced in huge numbers at a time when the national economy was finally seen to be on a sustained upswing. Adding the name "Rekord" in 1953 built on the theme of sporting success, and reflected a spirit of optimism which the model's marketplace performance would justify.

Evolution

1953/54
The Opel Olympia Rekord was introduced with a new generously proportioned body and an old 1,488 cc engine in March 1953. The top seller, by far, was the two-door saloon. From August 1953 Opel also offered a 2-door cabriolet ("Cabrio-Limouisine") which, despite costing only an extra DM 300, sold in very small numbers. Also available from August was a 3-door estate which Opel branded as the Opel Olympia Rekord CarAVan. The resulting eleven syllable name was evidently no handicap in the marketplace, since the "Caravan" name would turn up on many subsequent Opel estate models. The styling was upbeat and an unapologetic tribute to the designs that General Motors were producing in Detroit, with a particularly striking open mouthed front grill which reminded commentators of a shark's mouth (der "Haifischmaul-Kuelhergrill"). Some customers may have been irritated that all the cars were delivered with their standard steel wheels painted black regardless of the colour of the car body, although sellers of after-market wheel trims were no doubt delighted by Opel's cost-cutting approach to painting the car's wheels.

The advertised price in Germany was DM 6,410 for the 2-door "Limousine" (sedan) and DM 6,710 for the "Cabrio-Limousine" and "Caravan" (estate). By July 1954 Opel had produced 113,966 "Limousine" (sedan) or "Cabrio-Limousine" Olympia Rekords along with 15,804 "Caravan" (estate) versions and 6,258 Olympia Rekord panel vans.

1954/55
Production of the first Olympia Rekord ended in July 1954 and in late summer 1954 the mildly facelifted 1955 car was presented. The advertised power output of the 1,488 cc engine was unchanged at 40 hp (29 kW) despite a slight increase in the compression ratio from 6.3:1 to 6.5:1. The back window grew in size and the front grill was modified, through the addition of a single thick horizontal bar across the hitherto "open-mouthed" grill. This new adornment earned for the 1956 model, when coloured green, the soubriquet "Gurkenraspel" ("cucumber grater").

A new base model was offered at DM 5,850, which was slightly above DM 1,000 more expensive than the market leading Volkswagen. Opel's new entry level family car also received a reduced name, being badged simply as the Opel Olympia, while the other models in the range continued with the Opel Olympia Rekord name. The 1955 model year also saw the introduction of a light panel van version.

1955/56
The 1956 model, introduced towards the end of 1955, featured simplified bumpers from which the over-riders had disappeared. The hitherto "open-mouthed" grill was now filled with closely packed thin vertical bars. Further price reductions followed the trend also followed by other German auto-makers during the mid-1950s and the advertised German market price for the 1956 model ranged from 5,410 to 6,560 marks. The old 1,488 cc engine was also upgraded with a further increase in the compression ratio, now to 6.9:1, and the advertised maximum power was increased to 45 hp (33 kW). In other respects the old engine was very little changed.

In July 1956 the 2-door cabriolet version was withdrawn. It had not sold well: the few survivors are much prized by enthusiasts and collectors half a century later.

1956/57
The 1957 model appeared in July 1956. The grill was again modified, the roof was slightly flattened and the exterior acquired even more chrome embellishment. Although the company had previously shunned significant mechanical changes when making their annual upgrades, they did now introduced an all-synchromesh gearbox.

German market advertised prices now stood between DM 5,510 and 6,560. By way of comparison, 1957 was the year that Volkswagen finally managed to sink the price of their entry-level Beetle to just below DM 4,000.

The Opel Olympia Rekord was superseded in August 1957 by the new, larger and more flamboyantly styled Rekord P1 which would for the first time be offered with four doors. The 1937 Opel Olympia engine would continue to power entry level Opel Rekord models till 1965, however.

Commercial
During the four-year period between 1953 and 1957, Opel recorded production of 582,924 Olympia Rekords, with the rate accelerating markedly in 1957. It was still produced at about half the rate of the Volkswagen Beetle, but it was repeatedly Germany's second best seller, and the first of a long line of Opel's that would outsell competitor vehicles from Ford, both in Germany and in key European export markets. During six years from 1952 to 1958, Ford recorded production of 564,863 Taunus 12Ms and 15Ms which were comparable to the middleweight Opel in many ways, though half a class down in terms of price and (at least in the case of the 12M version) power.

Technical data

See also 
 Opel Rekord

Sources 
 „Auto- und Motorrad-Welt“, Deutscher Sportverlag Kurt Stoof, Köln, Heft 6/1953
 Arthur Westrup: Meine Erfahrungen mit dem Opel-Olympia Rekord 58 (= Meine Erfahrungen mit dem ...., Band 8). Bielefeld: Delius, Klasing & Co. 1958, 47 Seiten.

External links 

 Weitere Infos bei der Alt Opel IG

Olympia Rekord
Sedans
Station wagons
Executive cars
Rear-wheel-drive vehicles
Cars introduced in 1953